The 1922 Clapham by-election was held on 9 May 1922.  The by-election was held due to the resignation of the incumbent Coalition Conservative MP, Sir Arthur du Cros, Bt.  

It was won by the Coalition Conservative candidate Sir John Leigh, 1st Baronet.

Candidates
Clapham Liberal Association decided not to contest the by-election.

References

Clapham by-election
Clapham,1922
Clapham by-election
Clapham,1922
Clapham
Unopposed by-elections to the Parliament of the United Kingdom (need citation)
Clapham by-election